The Gibbo River, a perennial river of the North-East Murray catchment of the Murray-Darling basin, is located in the Alpine and East Gippsland regions of Victoria, Australia. It flows from the northwestern slopes of the Australian Alps, south and joins with Morass Creek southeast of Lake Dartmouth.

Course
Formed by the confluence of the Straight Running Creek and the Sassafras Creek, the Gibbo River rises in remote state forestry land, below the Great Dividing Range. The river flows generally south by southwest, joined by three minor tributaries before reaching its confluence with the Morass Creek at Lake Dartmouth, formed by the Dartmouth Dam. The river descends  over its  course.

Recreation

Picnic tables and wood-fired barbecues are available at the camp site.

An area of approximately  located adjacent to where the Gibbo River and Morass Creek empty into Lake Dartmouth, named the Dart River Goldfields Area, is listed as an indicative area on the Register of the National Estate. The area is considered historically significant due to its relatively undisturbed setting of the history of gold mining, with many machinery relics from the 1870s.

See also

References

External links

North-East catchment
Rivers of Gippsland (region)
Victorian Alps